Geobacter argillaceus  is a non-spore-forming and motile bacterium from the genus of Geobacter which has been isolated from kaolin clay.

See also 
 List of bacterial orders
 List of bacteria genera

References

 

Bacteria described in 2007
Thermodesulfobacteriota